Borys Pavlovych Orlovskyi (born 16 January 1993) is a Ukrainian professional footballer who plays as a defensive midfielder for FC Continentals in the Canadian Soccer League.

Club career

Europe 
Orlovskyi began his career in his home region in 2010 with Bukovyna Chernivtsi in the Ukrainian First League. After several seasons with Bukovyna, he was loaned to Tavriya Simferopol in the country's top tier the Ukrainian Premier League in 2012. His stint in the Crimea was short-lived as he failed to make an appearance for the club, resulting in him returning to Bukovyna. In 2014, he played abroad in the Caucasus region with FC Gandzasar Kapan in the Armenian Premier League. In his single season in Armenia, he played in 10 matches and recorded one goal. His lone goal was against FC Mika on September 27, 2014. 

For the remainder of the 2015 season, he returned to his former club Bukovyna. Following his brief stint in Bukovyna, he played in the country's third tier the Ukrainian Second League with Veres Rivne. He helped the team secure promotion to the second tier and re-signed with the club in 2016. He departed from Veres after the conclusion of the 2016-17 season. Following his release from Veres, he signed with FC Lviv. His tenure with Lviv was brief as he mutually parted ways with the club in early 2018. 

Orlovskyi returned to the third tier with former club Veres Rivne where he served as the team captain. After a season with Veres, he departed from the club. In 2019, he returned to his home club Bukovyna for his third and final stint. He played his final season with Bukovyna in 2021. On 1 May 2021 he missed a penalty against FC Chernihiv saved by Oleksandr Shyray at the Chernihiv Arena in the 2020–21 season.

Canada  
In 2022, he played abroad once more this time in the Canadian Soccer League with FC Continentals. Throughout the season he helped the club secure a postseason berth by finishing fourth in the standings. He featured in the CSL Championship final where Continentals defeated Scarborough SC for the title.

International career
Orlovskyi is the member of Ukraine national under-18 football team last time and participated at Vladislav Granatkin's Cup in Russia in January 2011.

References

External links 
 
 
 

1993 births
Living people
Piddubny Olympic College alumni
Ukrainian footballers
Ukraine youth international footballers
Association football midfielders
FC Bukovyna Chernivtsi players
SC Tavriya Simferopol players
FC Gandzasar Kapan players
FC Lviv players
NK Veres Rivne players
KF Trepça'89 players
FC Continentals players
Armenian Premier League players
Ukrainian First League players
Ukrainian Second League players
Football Superleague of Kosovo players
Ukrainian expatriate footballers
Expatriate footballers in Armenia
Ukrainian expatriate sportspeople in Armenia
Expatriate footballers in Kosovo
Ukrainian expatriate sportspeople in Kosovo
Sportspeople from Chernivtsi
Canadian Soccer League (1998–present) players